is a Japanese boxing manga series written and illustrated by George Morikawa. It has been serialized by Kodansha in Weekly Shōnen Magazine since 1989 and collected in over 136 tankōbon to date. It follows the story of high school student Makunouchi Ippo, as he begins his career in boxing and over time obtains many titles and defeats various opponents.

The manga currently has more than 136 tankōbon volumes published in Japan by Kodansha. The first manga volume released on February 17, 1990, and the 137th on March 16, 2023.



Volume list

Volumes 1–20

Volumes 21–40

Volumes 41–60

Volumes 61–80

Volumes 81–100

Volumes 101–120

Volumes 121–current

References

Manga volumes